The president of the German Democratic Republic was the head of state of the German Democratic Republic, commonly known as East Germany, from 1949 until 1960. The office was created by the Constitution of 1949 (Section V). The president of the Republic was elected by the People's Chamber (Volkskammer) and the Chamber of States (Länderkammer), the two chambers of parliament. The office was mostly ceremonial in nature. If necessary, the President of the Volkskammer acted as the president of the Republic.

The sole incumbent was Wilhelm Pieck of the Socialist Unity Party of Germany (SED), elected on 11 October 1949 and re-elected in 1953 and in 1957. Shortly after the death of Pieck on 7 September 1960, the Constitution was amended. The Law concerning the formation of the State Council of 12 September 1960 introduced a collective head of state instead of the presidency, the State Council of East Germany. In the last, pro-Western phase of East Germany in 1989/90, the State Council was abolished; President of the People's Chamber Sabine Bergmann-Pohl acted as interim head of state.

Election 
The president of the Republic was elected for a term of four years by a joint session of the Volkskammer and the Länderkammer, which was convened and presided over by the President of the Volkskammer. Any citizen who was at least thirty-five years old was eligible for the post.

The administrative reform of 1952 led to the dissolution of the states (Länder) of East Germany. The Landerkammer thereby became meaningless; it met in 1954 for the last time and was formally abolished in 1958. As a result, the Volkskammer alone was responsible for the election of the president.

Oath of office 
On assuming office, the president of the Republic took the following oath before a joint session of the Volkskammer and the Landerkammer:

Impeachment 
The president of the Republic might be recalled before the expiration of his term by a joint resolution of the Volkskammer and the Landerkammer. Such a resolution required a two-thirds majority of the statutory number of representatives.

Duties and competences 
Largely a ceremonial position (similarly to the president of West Germany), the duties and competences of the president of the Republic as stipulated in articles 104–108 of the Constitution of 1949:

 Promulgating the laws of the Republic.
 Receiving the oath of office from members of the Council of Ministers upon their assumption of duties.
 Representing the Republic in international relations.
 Concluding and signing treaties with foreign countries on behalf of the Republic.
 Accrediting and receiving ambassadors and ministers.

To become effective, all orders and decrees issued by the president of the Republic needed to be countersigned by the chairman of the Council of Ministers or the competent Minister.

The president exercised the right of pardon on behalf of the Republic. In this function he was advised by a committee of the Volkskammer.

Incapacitation and vacancy 
Whenever the president of the Republic was unable to attend to his office, he was represented by the president of the Volkskammer. If such incapacity is expected to continue for a protracted period, a substitute was to be appointed by (a specific) law.

Whenever the presidency was terminated prematurely, the same rule applied until the election of a new president.

President Pieck was already 73 years old when he won his first term in 1949. Although he served as co-chairman of the SED alongside Prime Minister Otto Grotewohl from 1949 to 1950, he never played a major role in the party. Most of the power was held by Walter Ulbricht, First Secretary of the party from 1950. This changed after the abolition of the presidential office, since the leader of the SED was usually also head of state.

Abolition 
After Wilhelm Pieck had died in 1960, the presidency was abolished in favor of a collective body, the State Council. The State Council was elected in the same way as the president, by the Volkskammer, and initially exercised the powers of the presidency. In reality, the State Council was effectively represented by its chairman, and it was reduced to a ceremonial body by 1974, with its chairman deriving real power from leadership of the SED.

With the Constitution of 1968, the last references to the presidency were eliminated.

After the Peaceful Revolution, there were plans to reintroduce the office of the president of the Republic by constitutional law from 1990 onward, which did not happen in the course of German reunification.

Presidential standards

Gallery

See also 
 President of Germany (1919–1945)
 President of Germany

References

External links 
 1949 Constitution of the GDR (full text in German)
 1968 Constitution of the GDR (full text in German)

Government of East Germany
!
1949 establishments in East Germany
1960 disestablishments in East Germany
East Germany
Lists of political office-holders in Germany
Titles of national or ethnic leadership
Titles held only by one person